Kirilo II was Archbishop of Peć and Serbian Patriarch from 1759 to 1763. He was an ethnic Greek.

In 1758, internal crisis and struggles in the Serbian Patriarchate of Peć resulted in deposition of Serbian Patriarch Gavrilo IV, and soon after that another ethnic Greek — metropolitan Cyril, was appointed at his place, becoming Serbian Patriarch "Kirilo II". New patriarch had to face many difficulties, since the Serbian Patriarchate of Peć was in great debt, and he also faced some internal opposition among Serbian clergy. One of Serbian metropolitans, Vasilije Jovanović-Brkić of Dabar and Bosnia managed to depose and succeed patriarch Kirilo II in 1763, becoming new Serbian patriarch as Vasilije I.

References

Sources

External links
 Official site of the Serbian Orthodox Church: Serbian Archbishops and Patriarchs

Kirilo II
18th-century Greek people
Greeks from the Ottoman Empire